Ceramium nodulosum is a small red marine alga.
There is confusion surrounding this name.

Description
Ceramium nodulosum is a small filamentous branching alga growing to a height of 30 cm in tufts of erect branches usually fully corticate. The apices of main axes are straight or slightly curled inward at the tips. It attached by a rhizoids with many erect branches. The axes and branches are usually fully corticate and, unlike some other species, it is without spines.

Reproduction
Gametophytes are dioecious. Cystocarpes and tetrasporasngia are formed on the branches.

Distribution
Generally found around Great Britain and Ireland.

Nomenclature
There is some confusion with this name. As described above the species is Ceramium nodulosum (Lightfoot) Ducluzeae.
 The species Ceramium virgatum Roth is noted as a possible synonym elsewhere.

References

nodulosum